Parkgate Welfare F.C. was an English association football club based in Parkgate, Rotherham, South Yorkshire.

History 
Little is known of the club other than that they entered the FA Cup in 1950 and won the Sheffield Association League in 1962.

League and cup history

Honours

League 
 Sheffield Association League
 Champions: 1961–62

Cup

Records 
 Best FA Cup performance: 1st Qualifying Round, 1950–51
 Best FA Amateur Cup performance: Extra Preliminary Round, 1952–53

References 

Defunct football clubs in England
Defunct football clubs in South Yorkshire
Sheffield Association League